Menjelma is the first studio album from Malaysian pop singer-songwriter Kaer Azami which was released in February 2007 in Malaysia, Singapore and Brunei. The album features 11 tracks altogether including one bonus track ("Kembali Bersama"), which Kaer first recorded it in a compilation album of Akademi Fantasia season 2. The first single from this album is "Izinku Pergi".

Track listing

Charts

Singles

2007 albums
Kaer Azami albums
Malay-language albums